Fenchel is a surname. Notable people with the surname include:

Heinz Fenchel (1906–1988), German art director
Käte Fenchel (1905–1983), German mathematician 
Tom Fenchel (born 1940), Danish marine biologist 
Werner Fenchel (1905–1988), German mathematician

See also
Fenchel's Law, a regularity in population ecology 
Fennel

German-language surnames